Geranium × oxonianum,  the Oxford geranium, is a hybrid variety of flowering plant in the family Geraniaceae, which is a 1932 cross of garden origin between Geranium endressii and Geranium versicolor. It can be invasive. 

The following have been given the Royal Horticultural Society's Award of Garden Merit:-
'A.T. Johnson' 
'Beholder's Eye' 
'Wageningen'

References 

oxonianum
Hybrid plants